Lee Hsin-han and Denys Molchanov won the title, beating Gong Maoxin and Peng Hsien-yin 3–6, 7–6(7–5), [10–4]

Seeds

Draw

Draw

References
 Main Draw

China International Suzhou - Doubles